The 1987 Omloop Het Volk was the 42nd edition of the Omloop Het Volk cycle race and was held on 28 February 1987. 
The race started and finished in Sint-Amandsberg. 198 riders started the race, only 63 finished. The race was won by Teun van Vliet.

Complete results

References

1987
Omloop Het Nieuwsblad
Omloop Het Nieuwsblad
February 1987 sports events in Europe
1987 Super Prestige Pernod International